The 2021 Western Athletic Conference men's soccer tournament was the postseason men's soccer tournament for the Western Athletic Conference held from November 10 to November 14, 2021. The five-match tournament took place at GCU Stadium in Phoenix, Arizona on the campus of Grand Canyon University. The six-team single-elimination tournament consisted of three rounds based on seeding from regular-season divisional conference play.  The defending champions were the Air Force Falcons.  Air Force was unable to defend their crown, falling 2–2 in a penalty shoot-out against  in the First Round.   went on to win the title over Grand Canyon in a penalty shoot-out. This was Seattle's fifth WAC Tournament victory in program history all of which have come under head coach Pete Fewing.  As tournament champions, Seattle earned the WAC's automatic bid to the NCAA Tournament.

Seeding 
Teams were seeded based on their regular season records. Tiebreakers were used to determine the seedings of teams who finished with identical conference records. Seattle earned the second seed by virtue of a 2–1 victory over Seattle on October 16.

Bracket

Source:

Schedule

First round

Semifinals

Final

Statistics

Goalscorers

All-Tournament team

Source:

MVP in bold

References 

Western Athletic Conference men's soccer seasons
tournament